The following is a list of events from British radio in 1932.

Events
15 March
First BBC radio broadcast from the new Broadcasting House in London; all programmes transfer from 15 May.
The BBC Dance Orchestra first broadcasts under the direction of Henry Hall.
May – Radio Luxembourg begins high-powered longwave test transmissions aimed directly at the British Isles (which prove, inadvertently, to be the first radio modification of the ionosphere).
15 October – First performance before an audience in The Concert Hall of Broadcasting House.
30 November – The BBC begins a series of radio broadcasts to mark the 75th birthday of composer Sir Edward Elgar.
19 December – The BBC Empire Service, later known as the BBC World Service, begins broadcasting using a shortwave radio facility at its Daventry transmitting station.
25 December – Inaugural Royal Christmas Message delivered by King George V from Sandringham House; scheduled for approximately 3.05pm; the text has been written by Rudyard Kipling.

Births
19 January – George MacBeth, Scottish-born poet and radio poetry producer (died 1992)
28 January – Norman de Mesquita, sports commentator (died 2013)

Deaths
23 November – Percy Pitt, BBC Director of Music (born 1869)

References 

 
Years in British radio
Radio